Dysferlin also known as dystrophy-associated fer-1-like protein is a protein that in humans is encoded by the DYSF gene.

Dysferlin is linked with skeletal muscle repair. A defect in the DYSF gene, located on chromosome 2p12-14, results in several types of muscular dystrophy; including Miyoshi myopathy (MM), Limb-girdle muscular dystrophy type 2B (LGMD2B) and Distal Myopathy (DM). A reduction or absence of dysferlin, termed dysferlinopathy, usually becomes apparent in the third or fourth decade of life and is characterised by weakness and wasting of various voluntary skeletal muscles.

Structure 

The human dysferlin protein is a 237 kilodalton type-II transmembrane protein. It contains a large intracellular cytoplasmic N-terminal domain, an extreme C-terminal transmembrane domain, and a short C-terminal extracellular domain. The cytosolic domain of dysferlin is composed of seven highly conserved C2 domains (C2A-G) which are conserved across several proteins within the ferlin family, including dysferlin homolog myoferlin. In fact, the C2 domain at any given position is more similar to the C2 domain at the corresponding position within other ferlin family members than the adjacent C2 domain within the same protein. This suggests that each individual C2 domain may in fact play a specific role in dysferlin function. A crystal structure of the C2A domain of human dysferlin has been solved, and reveals that the C2A domain changes conformation when interacting with calcium ions, which is consistent with a growing body of evidence suggesting that the C2A domain plays a role in calcium-dependent lipid binding. In addition to the C2 domains, dysferlin also contains "FerA" and "DysF" domains. Mutations in both FerA and DysF can cause muscular dystrophies. DysF domain has an interesting structure as in contains one DysF domain within another DysF domain, a result of gene duplication; however, the function of this domain is currently unknown. FerA domain is conserved among all members of ferlin protein family. There has been two single point mutations in dysferlin FerA domain that have been associated with muscular dystrophy. FerA domain is a four helix bundle and it can interact with membrane, usually in a calcium-dependent manner.

Function 
The most intensively studied role for dysferlin is in a cellular process called membrane repair. Membrane repair is a critical mechanism by which cells are able to seal dramatic wounds to the plasma membrane. Muscle is thought to be particularly prone to membrane wounds given that muscle cells transmit high force and undergo cycles of contraction. Dysferlin is highly expressed in muscle, and is homologous to the ferlin family of proteins, which are thought to regulate membrane fusion across a wide variety of species and cell types. Several lines of evidence suggest that dysferlin may be involved in membrane repair in muscle. First, dysferlin-deficient muscle fibers show accumulation of vesicles (which are critical for membrane repair in non-muscle cell types) near membrane lesions, indicating that dysferlin may be required for fusion of repair vesicles with the plasma membrane. Further, dysferlin-deficient muscle fibers take up extracellular dyes to a greater extent than wild-type muscle fibers following laser-induced wounding in-vitro. Dysferlin is also markedly enriched at membrane lesions with several additional proteins thought to be involved in membrane resealing, including annexin and MG53. Exactly how dysferlin contributes to membrane resealing is not clear, but biochemical evidence indicates that dysferlin may bind lipids in a calcium-dependent manner, consistent with a role for dysferlin in regulating fusion of repair vesicles with the sarcolemma during membrane repair. Furthermore, live-cell imaging of dysferlin-eGFP expressing myotubes indicates that dysferlin localizes to a cellular compartment that responds to injury by forming large dysferlin-containing vesicles, and formation of these vesicles may contribute to wound repair. Dysferlin may also be involved in Alzheimer's disease pathogenesis.

Interactions 

Dysferlin has been shown to interact with Caveolin 3 in skeletal muscle, and this interaction is thought to retain dysferlin within the plasma membrane. Dysferlin also interacts with MG53, and a functional interaction between dysferlin, caveolin-3 and MG53 is thought to be critical for membrane repair in skeletal muscle.

References

Further reading

External links 
  GeneReviews/NCBI/NIH/UW entry on Dysferlinopathy including Miyoshi Distal Myopathy (Miyoshi Myopathy), Limb-Girdle Muscular Dystrophy Type 2B (LGMD2B)
 LOVD mutation database: DYSF

Proteins